Medius kalimantani is a moth of the family Erebidae first described by Michael Fibiger in 2011. It is found on Borneo (it was described from Kalimantan).

The wingspan is about 11 mm. The forewings are relatively long and narrow. The ground colour is white beige, suffused with light-brown scales in the medial, subterminal and terminal areas. There are black-brown patches at the base of the costa and at the upper quadrangular medial area. The crosslines are almost untraceable. The terminal line is indicated by black interveinal dots. The hindwing ground colour is grey with an indistinct discal spot.

References

Micronoctuini
Moths described in 2011
Taxa named by Michael Fibiger